The 2010–11 Turkish Cup was the 49th edition of the annual tournament that determined the association football Süper Lig Turkish Cup champion under the auspices of the Turkish Football Federation (TFF). Beşiktaş successfully defeated İstanbul B.B. in the final. This tournament was conducted under the UEFA Cup system having replaced at the 44th edition a standard knockout competition scheme. 

Beşiktaş advanced to the play-off round of the 2011–12 UEFA Europa League and qualified for the 2011 Turkish Super Cup. Trabzonspor were eliminated in the group stage. Trabzonspor (defending champions), Bursaspor (1st, Süper Lig), Fenerbahçe (2nd), and Galatasaray (3rd), automatically qualified for the group stage.

Teams

First round
The draw for the First Round took place at the headquarters of the TFF in İstanbul on 23 August 2010. The matches were played on 1 September 2010.

|}

Second round
The draw for the Second Round was conducted at the headquarters of the TFF in İstanbul on 14 September 2010. The matches were played on 22 September 2010.

|}

Play-off round
The draw for the Third Round was conducted at the headquarters of the TFF in İstanbul on 30 September 2010. The matches will be played on 26-27–28 October 2010.

|}

Group stage
The group stage consists of four groups with five teams each. The top three teams that finished from 1st place to 3rd in the 2009–10 Süper Lig and the previous cup winners were seeded as group heads: Bursaspor, Fenerbahçe, Galatasaray, and cup winners Trabzonspor. The sixteen teams who qualified through the first two rounds of elimination matches were randomly drawn into one of the four groups.

Every team will play every other team of its group once, either home or away. The winners and runners-up of each group will qualify for the quarterfinals.

Group A

Group B

Group C

Group D

Bracket

Quarter-finals
In this round the winners and runners-up of all of the previous round's groups were entered. The draw was conducted by the TFF in the Ataköy Olympic House in İstanbul on 28 January 2011 at 11:00 local time. There were no seedings in the draw, and consequently teams from the same groups were drawn against each other. The teams competed in two-leg playoffs. The first leg matches were played on 2 and 3 February while the second leg matches were played on 2 and 3 March 2011. The lowest-ranked, and incidentally the only non-Süper Lig team to qualify for this stage of the competition was Gaziantep Büyükşehir Belediyespor, at that time competing in the TFF First League, the 2nd tier of Turkish football.

|}

Semi-finals

The draw was conducted by the TFF in the Ataköy Olympic House in İstanbul on 28 January 2011 at 11:00 local time. The teams competed in two-leg playoffs. The first leg matches were played on 6 and 7 April while the second leg matches were played on 20 and 21 April 2011.

|}

Final

The final was played in Kadir Has Stadium, Kayseri on 11 May 2011. This was the first time for Kayseri Kadir Has Stadium to host a cup final, which opened its gates on March 2009. The kick-off was at 20:00 EEST. The match ended on a 2-2 draw and there were no goals in the extra time. Beşiktaş J.K. went on to win the final on penalties.

See also
2011 Turkish Super Cup

References

Turkish Cup seasons
Cup
Turkey